Henry R. Myles (born about 1824 in Kentucky) was a physician who migrated to Los Angeles, California, soon after the city became a state following the Mexican–American War. He was elected to the Los Angeles Common Council, the governing body of the city, in a special election on September 6, 1853, for a term that ended May 4, 1854.

He was also the Los Angeles agent for the David W. Alexander and Phineas Banning stagecoach company, and in 1860 he opened Los Angeles's fourth drugstore. His partner in the enterprise on Main Street, "nearly opposite the Bella Union," was Dr. J. C. Welch, a South Carolina-born dentist.

Myles was killed in a boiler explosion of the steamship Ada Hancock on April 27, 1863, in San Pedro harbor, an accident that took twenty-six lives. His fiancée, M. Hereford, was mortally injured.

References

1824 births
1863 deaths
19th-century American physicians
Los Angeles Common Council (1850–1889) members